Begin to Breathe is Eru's debut album, released in the fall of 2005 in South Korea.  His first single off the album was a ballad titled "다시 태어나도" ("If I Was Reborn").  It also included the follow-up single "미안해" ("Sorry").

Production
The songs are accompanied with the string melodies that 100 people participated in. The song 'Sorry' contains melodies of acoustic guitar strings, song "Finding Lost Memories" is about the loss of love,  and song "If I Could Go Back" was self-written and composed by Eru. Song "If I Was Reborn" tells a story of a man who recently experienced a breakup missing his ex, and was composed by jeon seung woo of boygroup XO.

Music video
The music video for "If I Was Reborn" was directed by Jang jae-hyuk. Lee hyori  and Kim Hyun-joong was expected to appear on the music video but it was cancelled due to the change of scripts. This led to the two individuals mentioned in the thanks to section of the physical album.

Reception
As of 2005, october 5th, the album went no 1 in album sales on the hot tracks weekly best chart, passing the sales of Wheesung.

Track listing 
 다시 태어나도 ("If I Was Reborn")
 미안해 ("Sorry")
 숨은 추억 찾기 ("Finding Lost Memories")
 어떡해 ("What Do I Do?")
 말해요 ("Speak")
 내가 닮은 사람 ("The Similar Person")
 돌아갈 수 만 있다면 ("If I Could Go Back")
 Life 
 모르잖아요 ("You Don't Know")
 영원 그 다음까지... ("Until Forever After")
 내내 ("My My")

References

External links
  Eru's Official Site

2005 albums
Eru (singer) albums